A small number of municipalities in Serbia held local elections in 2013. These were not part of the country's regular cycle of local elections but instead took place in certain jurisdictions where either the local government had fallen or the last local elections for four-year terms had taken place in 2009.

All local elections in 2013 were held under proportional representation. Mayors were not directly elected but were instead chosen by elected members of the local assemblies. Parties were required to cross a five per cent electoral threshold (of all votes, not only of valid votes), although this requirement was waived for parties representing national minority communities.

Results

Belgrade

Voždovac 
An election was held in Voždovac on 15 December 2013 due to the expiration of the term of the previous municipal assembly, which was elected in 2009.

Aleksandar Savić of the Progressive Party was chosen as mayor after the election.

Zemun 
An election was held in Zemun on 2 June 2013 due to the expiration of the term of the previous municipal assembly, which was elected in 2009.

Dejan Matić of the Progressive Party was selected as mayor after the election. Aleksandar Šešelj, the son of Radical Party leader Vojislav Šešelj, appeared in the fifth position on the Radical list.

Vojvodina

Kovin 
An election was held in Kovin on 7 April 2013, due to the expiry of the term of the previous assembly elected in 2009.

Gordana Zorić of the Serbian Progressive Party was chosen as mayor after the election. She resigned the office in June 2014 after being elected to the National Assembly of Serbia, and fellow Progressive Party member Dušan Petrović was appointed as her successor. Petrović was in turn expelled from the Progressives in August 2014, in February 2015 he was replaced as mayor by Sanja Petrović, also of the Progressive Party.

In June 2015, shifting political alliances brought to power a new coalition administration that included the Socialist Party of Serbia, the Democratic Party, the Alliance of Vojvodina Hungarians, and former members of the Progressives. Socialist delegate Zoran Nikolić was chosen as mayor. His administration lasted until September 2015, when the Progressives returned to power with Sanja Petrović once again in the mayor's office. She served for the remainder of the term.

Odžaci 
An election was held in Odžaci on 15 December 2013, at what was effectively the expiration of the term of the previous assembly elected in January 2010.

Dušan Marijan of the Progressive Party was chosen as mayor when the new assembly convened in January 2014.

Vrbas 
An election was held in Vrbas on 13 October 2013 due to the expiration of the term of the previous municipal assembly, which had been elected in 2009.

Bratislav Kažić of the Progressive Party was selected as mayor after the election. Kažić resigned in July 2016 and was replaced by Milan Glušac of the same party. Glušac, in turn, resigned in January 2017 to prompt new local elections ahead of schedule (coinciding with the 2017 Serbian presidential election) and was appointed as leader of a provisional authority that governed the municipality in advance of the vote.

Šumadija and Western Serbia

Kosjerić
A local election was held in Kosjerić on 26 May 2013, due to the expiry of the term of the previous assembly elected in 2009.

Incumbent mayor Milijan Stojanić of the Serbian Progressive Party was confirmed for another term in office after the election.

References

Local elections in Serbia
LOc